Josef Zilker (born 19 March 1891, date of death unknown) was an Austrian cyclist. He competed in two events at the 1912 Summer Olympics.

References

External links
 

1891 births
Year of death missing
Austrian male cyclists
Olympic cyclists of Austria
Cyclists at the 1912 Summer Olympics
Cyclists from Vienna